{{DISPLAYTITLE:C21H28O5}}
The molecular formula C21H28O5 (molar mass: 360.44 g/mol, exact mass: 360.193674 u) may refer to:

 Aldosterone
 Cortisone
 Prednisolone, a corticosteroid
 Roxibolone, an anabolic steroid

Molecular formulas